Political parties in Kyrgyzstan now have greater political power and freedom to campaign than at any previous time in the history of the nation. During the Akayev administration's rule, opposition parties were allowed, but were widely considered to have no real chance of gaining power. The Tulip Revolution brought an authentic multi-party system to Kyrgyzstan.

Political parties in Kyrgyzstan are mainly focused around the ideologies and personality of the party leaders rather than a static party-wide set of ideologies, so party programmes are subject to change if the party leadership changes.

Parties represented in the Supreme Council

Other parties

Agrarian Labor Party of Kyrgyzstan
Agrarian Party of Kyrgyzstan
Ak Zhol
Alga Kyrgyzstan (Forward Kyrgyzstan) Party
Ar-Namys (Dignity) Party
Ata-Meken (Fatherland) Socialist Party
Banner National Revival Party
Beren
Bir Bol
Communist Party of Kyrgyzstan
Democratic Movement of Kyrgyzstan
Democratic Women's Party of Kyrgyzstan
Erkin Kyrgyzstan Progressive and Democratic Party
Hizb ut-Tahrir
Justice Party
Kyrgyzstan Party
Movement for the People's Salvation
Mutual Help Movement
My Country Party of Action
National Unity Democratic Movement
Onuguu–Progress
Party of Communists of Kyrgyzstan
Peasant Party
People's Party
Republican Party of Kyrgyzstan
Respublika Party of Kyrgyzstan
Social Democratic Party of Kyrgyzstan
Union of Democratic Forces

See also
Politics of Kyrgyzstan
List of political parties by country

Kyrgyzstan
 
Political parties
Political parties
Kyrgyzstan